Arthur H. Bakeraitis (February 19, 1925 – July 4, 2014) was an American professional basketball player. He played in the National Basketball League for the Detroit Vagabond Kings during the 1948–49 season and averaged 4.6 points per game.

Military service
Bakeraitis served in the United States Army in the WWII, with deployments to the Southern Philippines and Northern Solomons.

References

1925 births
2014 deaths
American men's basketball players
United States Army personnel of World War II
Basketball players from Michigan
Centers (basketball)
Detroit Vagabond Kings players
Forwards (basketball)
Junior college men's basketball players in the United States
Sportspeople from Bay City, Michigan
United States Army soldiers